Bell Island Airport  is located on Bell Island, Newfoundland and Labrador, Canada.

References

External links
 Page about this airport on COPA's Places to Fly airport directory

Registered aerodromes in Newfoundland and Labrador